Swensen's Inc. is a Canadian-owned global chain of ice cream restaurants that started in San Francisco, California, United States.

History
The company started in 1948 by Earle Swensen, who learned to make ice cream while serving in the U.S. Navy during World War II. Swensen opened his first shop at the corner of Union and Hyde Streets, along the cable car tracks in Russian Hill in San Francisco at what had been a failed ice cream parlor.  Although vanilla was his lifelong favorite, he developed more than 150 flavors, which he marketed under the motto "Good as Father Used to Make".  The original store sold ice cream and other frozen dessert specialties (such as sundaes and banana splits), with primarily take out service. Later other Swensen's franchisees added indoor seating and offered various types of food, including sandwiches and hamburgers.

Swensen sold the rights to franchise Swensen's Ice Cream Factories and Restaurants to William Meyer and investors in the 1970s but retained exclusive rights in San Francisco and continued to operate his original store (which still exists today) until 1994, a year before his death at age 83. Under new management the company expanded to 400 stores, mostly franchise locations, by the 1980s. However, in the 1990s it contracted to half of that size before being acquired and expanding again, mostly in Asia. USA stores continued to close until only three were left, of which one is the original San Francisco ice cream parlor and one is the main restaurant in Miami.

Today the company is owned by International Franchise Corp (IFC) of Markham, Ontario, Canada, which bought the franchise business from former frozen food manufacturer CoolBrands International in 2006. IFC also owns such notable brands as Yogen Früz, I Can't Believe It's Yogurt (ICBY), Golden Swirl, Yogurty's, Dreamery and Bresler's Ice Cream. The Swensen's chain now includes about 300 franchise outlets worldwide including locations in Asia, the Middle East, the United States, South America, India, Taiwan, Singapore, Cambodia, Malaysia, Philippines, Vietnam, Thailand, Laos and Pakistan.

In India, the company opened its first store in Bangalore at Mantri Mall, marking the first of 80 stores over the next 5 years scheduled to open all over South India. Swensen's is also now open in Ho Chi Minh City, Vietnam. In March 2014, Swensen's opened its first restaurant in Yangon, Myanmar.

In 1971, Hans Biermann opened a Swensen's in Santa Ana, CA. 18 years later he parted ways with Swensen's and changed the name to Hans’ Homemade Ice Cream and Deli. He still uses the same basic Swensen's recipes and has opened stores in Anaheim and Huntington Beach.

Popular culture
Swensen's was featured as a prize on the 1987 version of Super Sloppy Double Dare and on the 1987 Euro version of Finders Keepers and was featured in the 1985 film The Goonies. A Swensen's store can be glimpsed in the mall sequence of the 1985 film Commando starring Arnold Schwarzenegger, and also in the opening scene of the 1978 film, The Silent Partner, which starred Elliott Gould. Seinfelds "George Costanza" eats Swensen's ice cream after his tonsils are fully removed in the episode, "The Heart Attack."

References

Further reading

External links
 Swensen's main USA restaurant located in Miami, Florida
  Swensen's Thailand website 
 Swensen's Singapore website (in English)
  Swensen's Worldwide website 
 redorbit article on expansion in Asia

1948 establishments in California
Restaurants established in 1948
2006 mergers and acquisitions
Ice cream parlors
Restaurant chains in the United States
Companies based in San Francisco
Restaurants in San Francisco
Restaurants in Singapore
Companies based in Markham, Ontario
CoolBrands International